Boudenib (Berber:ⴱⵓⴷⵏⵉⴱ) is a small Berber town in eastern Morocco, close to the border with Algeria, in the Atlas Mountains. According to the 2004 census it had a population of 9,867.

Kef Aziza, a cave which is nearly 4 km long, is close to Boudenib and is considered one of the six major caves of Morocco.

References

External links 
 Lexicorient
 Chorouk Association of 

Populated places in Errachidia Province